The Stewart Foo Fighter JD2FF is a single-seat biplane homebuilt aircraft design that emulates fighter aircraft of World War I.

Design and development
The Foo Fighter was developed using similar construction features as the Stewart Headwind. The fuselage is welded steel tubing with fabric covering. The lower wing design is unusual, passing below the fuselage rather than attaching to it on either side. The first aircraft built used a Ford Falcon 200 CID engine that proved to be too heavy. A Franklin 130 hp engine was used next, but the engine went out of production. The final design was changed to accommodate a Lycoming O-235 or O-320 engine.

Operational history
The Foo Fighter was demonstrated for over 30 hours during the one-week Experimental Aircraft Association Convention in Oshkosh, Wisconsin In 1972.

Specifications (Stewart Foo Fighter)

See also

References

 Sport Aviation, Jan 1973, pp 53–55. Foo Fighter Flight Report

External links

Homebuilt aircraft